Lyttelton Stewart Forbes Winslow MRCP (31 January 1844 – 8 June 1913) was a British psychiatrist famous for his involvement in the Jack the Ripper and Georgina Weldon cases during the late Victorian era.

Career
Born in Marylebone in London, the son of psychiatrist Forbes Benignus Winslow and Susan Winslow née Holt, Winslow was possibly the most controversial psychiatrist of his time. As a boy he was brought up in lunatic asylums owned by his father, and was educated at Rugby School and Gonville and Caius College, Cambridge, transferring to Downing College at the University of Cambridge after four terms, where he took the MB degree in 1870. He was also a DCL(1873) of Trinity College Oxford and LL.D. of Cambridge University. A keen cricketer, Winslow captained the Downing College XI. In July 1864 he was a member of the Marylebone Cricket Club (MCC) team which played against South Wales, in which team was W. G. Grace.

In 1871 he was appointed a Member of the Royal College of Physicians (MRCP). He spent his medical career in an attempt to persuade the courts that crime and alcoholism were the result of mental instability. His attempt in 1878 to have Mrs Georgina Weldon committed as a lunatic at the instigation of her estranged husband William Weldon resulted in one of the most notorious court cases of the nineteenth century. The public notoriety the Weldon case caused earned him the displeasure of the medical establishment, which continued even after his death.

He became an adherent of the benefits of hypnotism in dealing with psychiatric cases. He took an active role in securing a reprieve for the four people sentenced to death for the murder by starvation of Mrs. Staunton at Penge in 1877. In 1878 he inquired into the mental condition of the Rev. Mr. Dodwell, who had shot at Sir George Jessel, the Master of the Rolls. Other trials in which Winslow was involved were those of Percy Lefroy Mapleton, convicted of the murder on the Brighton line; that of Florence Maybrick, and that of Amelia Dyer, the Reading baby farmer. He also appeared in many civil actions.

Jack the Ripper

Winslow managed his father's asylums after his death in 1874, but these were removed from his control following a family feud, so he turned his attention to forensic work. Also in 1874 he changed his surname to Forbes-Winslow.

In 1888, with a little manipulation of the evidence, Winslow came to believe he knew the identity of Jack the Ripper, and believed that if he was given a team of six Police Constables he could catch the murderer.

Winslow's suspect was Canadian G. Wentworth Smith, who had come to London to work for the Toronto Trust Society, and who lodged with a Mr and Mrs Callaghan at 27 Sun Street, Finsbury Square. Mr Callaghan became suspicious of Smith when he was heard saying that all prostitutes should be drowned. Smith also talked and moaned to himself, and kept three loaded revolvers hidden in a chest of drawers. Callaghan went to Winslow to express his suspicions, and he in turn contacted the police, who fully investigated his theory and showed it to be without foundation. Nevertheless, convinced that he was correct, for many years Winslow declared his theory at every chance, and claimed that his actions were responsible for forcing Jack the Ripper into abandoning murder and fleeing the country.

In his 1910 memoirs Winslow describes how he spent days and nights in Whitechapel: "The detectives knew me, the lodging house keepers knew me, and at last the poor creatures of the streets came to know me. In terror they rushed to me with every scrap of information which might, to my mind, be of value to me. The frightened women looked for hope in my presence. They felt reassured and welcomed me to their dens and obeyed my commands eagerly, and I found the bits of information I wanted".

When Winslow's claims about knowing the identity of the Ripper were reported in the English press Scotland Yard sent Chief Inspector Donald Swanson to interview him. Confronted with this senior police officer, Forbes Winslow immediately began to back-pedal. He said the story printed in the newspaper was not accurate and misrepresented the entire conversation between himself and the reporter. He further stated that the reporter had tricked him into talking about the Ripper murders. In fact, Winslow had never given any information to the police with the exception of his earlier theory concerning an escaped lunatic, a theory which even Forbes Winslow abandoned.

According to Donald McCormick, for a short period the police suspected Winslow of involvement in the killings because of his persistence and constant agitation in the Jack the Ripper case, and they checked on his movements at the time of the Ripper murders. He gained further publicity, and visited New York City in August 1895, to chair a meeting on lunacy at an International Medico-Legal Congress. He also appeared as an expert defence witness in some American cases involving lunacy.

Spiritualism
Winslow was the author of the 1877 pamphlet Spiritualistic Madness which identified spiritualism as a cause of insanity. He wrote that many believers in spiritualism were women and victims of their own gullibility. Winslow wrote that most believers in spiritualism were insane and suffer from mental delusions. He affirmed that there were "nearly ten thousand [such] persons in America" who had been confined in lunatic asylums.

Personal life

His older brother was the Revd Forbes Edward Winslow, the vicar of Epping, while his sister, Susanna Frances, married the humorist Arthur William à Beckett. Forbes Winslow published his memoirs, Recollections of Forty Years, in 1910, and also wrote the Handbook For Attendants on the Insane. He founded the British Hospital for Mental Disorders in London, and was a lecturer on insanity at Charing Cross Hospital and was a physician to the West End Hospital and the North London Hospital for Consumption. A member of the Marylebone Cricket Club (MCC) and a Vice-President of the Psycho—Therapeutic Society, he married twice. In the 1880s, he was the owner of the famous progenitor of the modern English Mastiff, Ch. Crown Prince.

Winslow died at his home in Devonshire Street, London, of a heart attack, aged 69. He left a widow, three sons and a daughter, Dulcie Sylvia, who, in 1906, married Roland St John Braddell (1880–1966).

Winslow appears as the central figure in the 2003 novel A Handbook for Attendants on the Insane. It has now been republished in a revised new edition as The Revelation of Jack the Ripper by Alan Scarfe.

Publications
Obscure Diseases of the Mind (1866)
Recollections of Forty Years (1910)
Handbook For Attendants On The Insane (1877)
Spiritualistic Madness (1877)
Mad Humanity: Its Forms Apparent and Obscure" (1898)
Doctor Forbes Winslow: Defender of the Insane Capella (2000)

References

External links
Letter of Forbes Winslow to actor Henry Irving (1879)
Knows "Jack the Ripper"; He Is Hopelessly Insane, Says Dr. Forbes Winslow of London. Confined In An English Asylum – He Was a Medical Student, and Religious Mania Caused Him to Butcher the Women of the Streets. The New York Times 1 September 1895
"Murderers I Have Met," By Dr. Forbes L. Winslow; Famous English Authority on Insanity Writes Interesting Recollections of Trials in Which He Took Part as an Expert, Including the Hannigan Case in New York. The New York Times 25 June 1911
In An Asylum Garden – biography of Forbes Winslow

1844 births
1913 deaths
Jack the Ripper
British psychiatrists
English psychiatrists
Alumni of Trinity College, Oxford
History of mental health in the United Kingdom
Alumni of Downing College, Cambridge
Alumni of Gonville and Caius College, Cambridge
Marylebone Cricket Club cricketers
People educated at Rugby School
English cricketers